The Damage Done is a book written by Hilary Davidson. and published by Forge Books (an imprint of Tor Books, owned by Macmillan Publishers) on 28 September 2010, which later went on to win the Anthony Award for Best First Novel in 2011.

References 

Anthony Award-winning works
Canadian mystery novels
2010 Canadian novels